Digi Sport is a Romanian sports television group which belongs to RCS & RDS:

Digi Sport (Romania)
Digi Sport (Hungary) 
Digi Sport (Slovakia)